Taraboura (Greek: Ταραμπούρα) is a neighbourhood in the city of Patras.  It is named after one of the Albanians in which he lived and had his house in his area.  Until 1990, it had a tall for the entrance and exit for carriage wheels and vehicles in Patras.  Residential housing arrived in 1980.

Taraboura features a closed arena where Olympiada Patras plays.  It is located at 24 Tisonas Street with the postcode 26623. Its capacity is 2,500 people.

References

The first version of the article is translated and is based from the article at the Greek Wikipedia (el:Main Page)

Neighborhoods in Patras